There are at least 30 species of crustaceans found in Montana. The Montana Department of Fish, Wildlife and Parks has identified a number of crustacean species as Species of Concern.

Crustaceans

Crustaceans (Crustacea) form a very large group of arthropods, usually treated as a subphylum, which includes such familiar animals as crabs, lobsters, crayfish, shrimp, krill and barnacles. Like other arthropods, crustaceans have an exoskeleton, which they moult to grow. They are distinguished from other groups of arthropods, such as insects, myriapods and chelicerates by the possession of biramous (two-parted) limbs, and by the nauplius form of the larvae.

Most crustaceans are free-living aquatic animals, but some are terrestrial (e.g. woodlice), some are parasitic (e.g. fish lice, tongue worms) and some are sessile (e.g. barnacles). The group has an extensive fossil record, reaching back to the Cambrian, and includes living fossils such as Triops cancriformis, which has existed apparently unchanged since the Triassic period. More than 10 million tons of crustaceans are produced by fishery or farming for human consumption, the majority of it being shrimp and prawns. Krill and copepods are not as widely fished, but may be the animals with the greatest biomass on the planet, and form a vital part of the food chain. The scientific study of crustaceans is known as carcinology (alternatively, malacostracology, crustaceology or crustalogy), and a scientist who works in carcinology is a carcinologist.

List of crustaceans of Montana

Malacostraca

Class: Malacostraca
 Astacid crayfishes Order: Decapoda, Family: Astacidae
 Pilose crayfish, Pacifastacus gambelii
 Signal crayfish, Pacifastacus leniusculus
 Cambarid crayfishes Order: Decapoda, Family: Cambaridae
 Calico crayfish, Orconectes immunis
 Virile crayfish, Orconectes virilis
 Gammarid amphipods Order: Amphipoda, Family: Crangonyctidae
 Stygobromus montanensis
 Stygobromus obscurus
 Stygobromus puteanus
 Stygobromus tritus
 Glacier amphipod, Stygobromus glacialis
 Order: Amphipoda, Family: Gammaridae
 Gammarus lacustris
 Order: Amphipoda, Family: Hyalellidae
 Hyalella azteca
 Order: Isopoda, Family: Asellidae
 Salmasellus steganothrix
 Caecidotea communis
 Caecidotea racovitzai

Fairy shrimp

Class: Branchiopoda
 Branchinectid brine shrimp Order:  Anostraca, Family: Branchinectidae
 Circumpolar fairy shrimp, Branchinecta paludosa
 Colorado fairy shrimp, Branchinecta coloradensis
 Giant fairy shrimp, Branchinecta gigas
 Rock pool fairy shrimp, Branchinecta packardi
 Versatile fairy shrimp, Branchinecta lindahli
 Chirocephalid brine shrimp Order: Anostraca, Family: Chirocephalidae
 Ethologist fairy shrimp, Eubranchipus serratus
 Ornate fairy shrimp, Eubranchipus ornatus
 Smoothlip fairy shrimp, Eubranchipus intricatus
 Clam shrimp Order: Spinicaudata, Family: Cyzicidae
 Bristletail clam shrimp, Caenestheriella setosa
 Clam Shrimp Order: Laevicaudata, Family: Lynceidae
 Hookleg clam shrimp, Lynceus mucronatus
 Fairy shrimp Order: Notostraca, Family: Triopsidae
 Bilobed tadpole shrimp, Lepidurus bilobatus
 Lemon tadpole shrimp, Lepidurus lemmoni
 Longtail tadpole shrimp, Triops longicaudatus
 Round spine tadpole shrimp, Lepidurus couesii
 Streptocephalid brine shrimp Order: Anostraca, Family: Streptocephalidae
 Greater plains fairy shrimp, Streptocephalus texanus
 Spinytail fairy shrimp, Streptocephalus sealii

See also

 List of amphibians and reptiles of Montana
 List of birds of Montana
 List of clams and mussels of Montana
 Mammals of Montana

Notes

References

Montana
Crustaceans
Crustaceans of the United States